Music of Old Serbia is an album by soloist Dragoslav Pavle Aksentijević with Ensemble Renaissance, released in 1987 on the PGP RTs label (re-released in 1997). Most of the material from this album is a remaster from Music of the Old Serbia, only this edition is dedicated exclusively to the Medieval Serbian chant and important members of the Serbo-Byzantine school.

Content

Serbian Medieval music, like the art of the period, developed within the sphere of the activities of Byzantine culture in the Serbian state from the 12th to the 15th centuries. However, it also continued to develop during the five centuries of slavery under the Turks. The singing was one-part, done as a solo or by a choir (in the two choirs of the church). Through hand movements, the director (domestikos) indicated the flow of the melody which was learned by heart. The lead singer (protopsaltos) would sing the initial intonational formula which was actually an abbreviated melodic preparation for the song, a melodic-rhythmic unit which characterised a certain church melody (knowledge of these formulae made it possible for an experienced singer to sing the whole song). Then the song would be started in unison, in one voice with the choir, though songs could also have other forms as well. If the melody were melismatic, the soloist would sing alone, accompanied by a sustained tone by the choir, the ison.
As sources (models) for the Serbian church melodies were the melodies of the Osmoglasnik. The Osmoglasnik was a collection of church songs for the Sunday service dedicated to the resurrection of Christ. These songs were repeated cyclically over eight weeks throughout the church year in one of the eight church voices - each voice corresponded to a certain modus based on a defined number of formulas. The songs of the Osmoglasnik served as a model for the creation of other church songs. Songs dedicated to Serbian sovereigns had a significant impact, as did those songs written by Serbian writers: in those songs the Medieval notes (the neume) are not to be found, but there are symbols for certain voices, which means that they were meant to be sung.

A certain number of Medieval Serbian manuscripts record the neumes. Their author was probably Kir Stefan the Serb, whose works reveal common melodic-rhythmical characteristics. Previous research has shown that he lived in the 15th century. Traces of his existence are found in the monastery in Kumanovo, in today's North Macedonia, in a monastery in Romania, but also in the court of despot Lazar Branković in Smederevo.
His work was followed by Nikola the Serb and Isaiah the Serb, whose songs were written in honour of Serbian saints. Even though Kir Stefan, Isaija and Nikola are the only reliably Serbian Medieval composers known till now, there is another name: "Joachim domestikos of Serbia" — as he signed in 1453 in more places in the manuscript number 2406 from the Athens National library.

Track listing
All tracks produced by Ensemble Renaissance.

Personnel
The following people contributed to Music of Old Serbia

Dragoslav Aksentijević-Pavle – domestikos
Vlado Mikić  - voice (track 11)
Aleksandar Dodig – ison
Mihajlo Đorić  - ison
Milan Milijanović  - ison
Nebojša Spasić – ison
Stanimir Spasojević  - ison

Ensemble Renaissance soloists:
Dragan Mlađenović – voice, ison
Miomir Ristić – ison
Ljudmila Gross-Marić  - voice (track 14)
Vojka Đorđević  - voice (track 14)

References

External links
album on discogs

1987 albums
Ensemble Renaissance albums